The 63rd Infantry Division (63-ya Pekhotnaya Diviziya) was an infantry formation of the Russian Imperial Army.

Organization
1st Brigade
249th Infantry Regiment
250th Infantry Regiment
2nd Brigade
251st Infantry Regiment
252nd Infantry Regiment

References

Infantry divisions of the Russian Empire